Faraday Technology Corporation is a fabless ASIC / SoC and silicon IP (intellectual property) provider. It produces hundreds of million ASIC chips annually worldwide in the applications of consumer electronics, multimedia, display, communication, networking, and PC peripheral/storage.

Overview
Faraday is a microchip design subsidiary of United Microelectronics Corporation.

Most of the firm's revenue comes from royalties on the chips it designed for customers.

History
The company was founded in 1993 as a spinoff from United Microelectronics Corporation and is now the biggest silicon IP company in Taiwan.

Faraday is collaborating with Samsung on 14 nm chip technology.

Offices 
- Headquarter in Hsinchu, Taiwan
- Tokyo, Japan
- Shanghai, China
- Suzhou, China
- San Jose, California, USA
- Beaverton, Oregon, USA
- Bangalore, INDIA

See also 
 List of companies of Taiwan

References 

Electronics companies established in 1993
Electronics companies of Taiwan
Taiwanese companies established in 1993

pl:Faraday